The second USS Paul Jones was a  in the United States Navy. She was named for John Paul Jones.

Construction
Paul Jones was laid down on 20 April 1899, by the Union Iron Works of San Francisco; launched on 14 June 1902; sponsored by Mrs. Elizabeth Goldsborough Adams; and commissioned on 19 July 1902.

Originally built as a torpedo boat destroyer, Paul Jones served in the Pacific Fleet, homeported at San Francisco. A unit of the Pacific Torpedo Fleet, she was at San Francisco at the beginning of World War I.

World War I
Paul Jones sailed on 23 April 1917, for Norfolk, Virginia, via San Diego, Acapulco, the Panama Canal Zone, and Guantanamo Bay, Cuba, arriving on 3 August.

Paul Jones departed the Brooklyn Navy Yard on 24 August and reported to Newport, Rhode Island where she began a series of convoy patrols up and down the coast and returning to Newport on 24 September. She then commenced training operations, in conjunction with other duties, off Norfolk, Lynnhaven Roads, and Chesapeake Bay, prior to reporting to Philadelphia on 20 December.

After departing Bermuda, she had to request permission to turn back due to a serious leak in her port after bunker. From 23–26 January, Paul Jones crew struggled against great odds and succeeded in saving the ship from sinking. Wallowing in stormy seas with her after fire room flooded, barely able to maintain headway, having lost all drinking and feed water and steaming under two boilers with salt feed, manning bucket brigades for lack of operable pumps, and receiving no answers to her distress signals, she finally sighted a light off St. David's Head, Bermuda, signalled the fort for assistance and dropped her anchor.

Paul Jones remained at Bermuda until 22 February for repairs and then sailed for Philadelphia escorted by  arriving on 25 February. Following permanent repairs at the Philadelphia Navy Yard, Paul Jones reported to Fortress Monroe, Virginia on 18 April, and performed various duties in and around Chesapeake Bay until 6 August.

Paul Jones made four trips from the burning ship to Von Steuben saving 1,250 Marines and officers together with over 50 tons of luggage. The next day she accompanied Henderson to Delaware Breakwater.

While in convoy on 7 August at sea, Paul Jones with several other ships in her group mistook  for an enemy submarine and fired upon her. The submarine was struck seven times in the conning tower before the mistake was apparent. Paul Jones escorted the damaged submarine to Delaware Bay, and arrived at the breakwater the following day.

Paul Jones reported at Hampton Roads on 9 August and remained in and around Chesapeake Bay conducting mine patrols, convoy duties and other services until slated for inactivation on 31 January 1919. She decommissioned on 29 July; was struck from the Naval Vessel Register on 15 September; and was sold on 3 January 1920 to Henry A. Hitner's Sons Company, Philadelphia, who subsequently scrapped her.

Noteworthy commanding officers
 Lieutenant Edgar Brown Larimer (15 January 1907-11 July 1907) (Later Rear Admiral and Chief of the Bureau of Ordnance (1931-1934))
 Lieutenant William A. Glassford (September 1911-May 1912, 1 February 1916-October 1916) (Later Vice admiral)
 Lieutenant Leo Hewlett Thebaud (1918-29 July 1919) (Later Vice admiral)

Notes

External links
DD-10 ship history 
Photos of USS Paul Jones

 

Bainbridge-class destroyers
World War I destroyers of the United States
Ships built in San Francisco
1902 ships
Ships built by Union Iron Works